Botley is the name of several places in the United Kingdom:

Botley, Buckinghamshire
Botley, Hampshire
Botley, Oxfordshire

See also
Botley the Robot, a fictional robot featured in Knowledge Adventure's JumpStart Adventures 3rd Grade: Mystery Mountain